Blind Faith is the only studio album by the English supergroup Blind Faith, originally released in 1969 on Polydor Records in the United Kingdom and Europe and on ATCO Records in the United States. It topped the album charts in the UK, Canada and US, and was listed at No. 40 on the US Soul Albums chart. It has been certified platinum by the RIAA.

Background 
The band contained two-thirds of the popular power trio Cream, in Ginger Baker and Eric Clapton, working in collaboration with British star Steve Winwood of the Spencer Davis Group and Traffic, along with Ric Grech of Family. They began to work out songs early in 1969, and in February and March the group was at Morgan Studios in London, preparing for the beginnings of basic tracks for their album, although the first few almost-finished songs did not show up until they were at Olympic Studios in April and May under the direction of producer Jimmy Miller.

The recording of their album was interrupted by a tour of Scandinavia, then a US tour from 11 July (Newport) to 24 August (Hawaii), supported by Free, Taste and Delaney & Bonnie and Friends. Although a chart topper, the LP was recorded hurriedly and side two consisted of just two songs, one of them a 15-minute jam entitled "Do What You Like". Nevertheless the band was able to produce two hits, Winwood's "Can't Find My Way Home" and Clapton's "Presence of the Lord".

Album cover controversy 
The cover was a photo by Bob Seidemann of a topless 11-year-old girl, Mariora Goschen, holding a silver-painted model of an aircraft, sculpted for the album shoot by Mick Milligan. The cover was considered controversial, with some seeing the model airplane as phallic. The American record company issued the album with an alternative cover, with a photograph of the band on the front, as well as the original cover.

The cover art was created by Seidemann, a friend and former flatmate of Clapton, who is primarily known for his photos of Janis Joplin and the Grateful Dead. In the mid-1990s, in an advertising circular intended to help sell lithographic reprints of the famous album cover, he explained his thinking behind the image.

Seidemann wrote that he approached a girl, reported to be 14 years old, on the London Underground, asking her to model for the cover. He eventually met her parents, but she proved to be too old for the effect he wanted. Instead, the model he used was her younger sister, Mariora Goschen, who was reported to be 11 years old. Goschen recalled that she was coerced into posing for the picture. "My sister said, 'They’ll give you a young horse. Do it!'" She was instead paid £40.

The image, which Seidemann titled "Blind Faith", became the inspiration for the name of the band itself, which had been unnamed when the artwork was commissioned. According to Seidemann: "It was Eric who elected to not print the name of the band on the cover. The name was instead printed on the wrapper, when the wrapper came off, so did the type." That had been done previously for several other albums.

In America, Atco Records used a cover based on elements from a flyer for the band's Hyde Park concert of 7 June 1969.

Release history 
The album was released on vinyl in 1969 on Polydor Records in the UK and Europe, and on Atco Records in the US. Polydor released a compact disc in 1986, adding two previously unreleased tracks, "Exchange and Mart" and "Spending All My Days", recorded by Ric Grech for an unfinished solo album, supported by George Harrison, Denny Laine, and Trevor Burton.

An expanded edition of the album was released on 9 January 2001, with previously unreleased tracks and 'jams' included. The studio electric version of "Sleeping in the Ground" had previously been released on the four-disc boxed set for Clapton, Crossroads (released 1988, recorded 1963–1987, including several previously unreleased live or alternate studio recordings). The bonus disc of jams does not include bassist Grech, who had yet to join the band, but includes a guest percussionist, Guy Warner. Two live tracks from the 1969 Hyde Park concert not included here, "Sleeping in the Ground" and a cover of "Under My Thumb", are also available on Winwood's four-disc retrospective The Finer Things.

Reception 

Commercially, Blind Faith charted at number one in both the US and the UK.

The album met with a mixed response from critics. Reviewing in August 1969 for The Village Voice, Robert Christgau found none of the songs exceptional and said, "I'm almost sure that when I'm through writing this I'll put the album away and only play it for guests. Unless I want to hear Clapton—he is at his best here because he is kept in check by the excesses of Winwood, who is rapidly turning into the greatest wasted talent in music. There. I said it and I'm glad." In Rolling Stone, Ed Leimbacher said of the quality, "not as much as I'd hoped, yet better than I'd expected." His colleagues at the magazine—Lester Bangs and John Morthland—were more impressed, especially Bangs in his appraisal of Clapton: "[With] Blind Faith, Clapton appears to have found his groove at last. Every solo is a model of economy, well- thought-out and well-executed with a good deal more subtlety and feeling than we have come to expect from Clapton."

Retrospective appraisals have been positive. According to Stereo Review in 1988, "for 20 years this has been a cornerstone in any basic rock library." AllMusic's Bruce Eder regarded the album as "one of the jewels of the Eric Clapton, Steve Winwood, and Ginger Baker catalogs". In 2016, Blind Faith was ranked 14th on Rolling Stones list of "The 40 Greatest One Album Wonders", which described "Can't Find My Way Home" and "Presence of the Lord" as "incredible".

Track listing

Deluxe edition

Personnel 
Blind Faith
 Steve Winwood – keyboards, vocals, guitars; bass guitar on "Presence of the Lord" and "Well All Right"; autoharp on "Sea of Joy"; bass pedals on "Jam No. 1–4"
 Eric Clapton – guitars; vocals on "Well All Right" and "Do What You Like"
 Ric Grech – bass guitar, violin on "Sea of Joy"; vocals on "Do What You Like"
 Ginger Baker – drums, percussion; vocals on "Do What You Like"

Guest
 Guy Warren – percussion on "Jam No. 1–4"

Production personnel
 Jimmy Miller – producer
 George Chkiantz, Keith Harwood, Andy Johns, Alan O'Duffy – engineers
 Alan O'Duffy, Andy Johns, Jimmy Miller – mixing
 Stanley Miller, Bob Seidemann – cover design and photography
 Chris Blackwell, Robert Stigwood – executive producers
 Margaret Goldfarb – production co-ordination
 Bill Levenson – reissue supervision
 Suha Gur – remastering
 Vartan – reissue art direction

Charts

Weekly charts

Year-end charts

Certifications

See also 
List of Billboard 200 number-one albums of 1969
List of Canadian number-one albums of 1969
List of UK Albums Chart number ones of the 1960s
 List of controversial album art

References 

1969 debut albums
Albums produced by Jimmy Miller
Albums recorded at Morgan Sound Studios
Albums recorded at Olympic Sound Studios
Atco Records albums
Atlantic Records albums
Blind Faith albums
Obscenity controversies in music
Polydor Records albums
Nudity in print media